Henry Alford (7 October 181012 January 1871) was an English churchman, theologian, textual critic, scholar, poet, hymnodist, and writer.

Life
Alford was born in London, of a Somerset family, which had given five consecutive generations of clergymen to the Anglican church. Alford's early years were passed with his widowed father, who was curate of Steeple Ashton in Wiltshire. He was a precocious boy, and before he was ten had written several Latin odes, a history of the Jews and a series of homiletic outlines. After a peripatetic school education he went up to Trinity College, Cambridge in 1827 as a scholar. In 1832 he was 34th wrangler and 8th classic, and in 1834 was made a fellow of Trinity.

Service
He had already taken orders, and in 1835 began his eighteen-year tenure of the vicarage of Wymeswold in Leicestershire, from which seclusion the twice-repeated offer of a colonial bishopric failed to draw him. He was Hulsean lecturer at Cambridge in 1841–1842, and steadily built up a reputation as scholar and preacher, which might have been greater if not for his excursions into minor poetry and magazine editing.

In 1844, he joined the Cambridge Camden Society (CCS) which published a list of do's and don'ts for church layout which they promoted as a science. He commissioned A.W.N. Pugin to restore St Mary's church. He also was a member of the Metaphysical Society, founded in 1869 by James Knowles.

In September 1853 Alford moved to Quebec Street Chapel, Marylebone, London, where he had a large congregation. In March 1857 Lord Palmerston advanced him to the deanery of Canterbury, where, until his death, he lived in the same energetic and diverse way as ever. He had been the friend of many of his eminent contemporaries, and was much loved for his amiable character. The inscription on his tomb, chosen by himself, is Diversorium Viatoris Hierosolymam Proficiscentis ("the lodging place of a traveller on his way to Jerusalem").

Published works
Alford was a talented artist, as his picture-book The Riviera (1870) shows, and he had abundant musical and mechanical talent. Besides editing the works of John Donne, he published several volumes of his own verse, The School of the Heart (1835), The Abbot of Muchelnaye (1841), The Greek Testament. The Four Gospels (1849), and a number of hymns, the best-known of which are "Forward! be our watchword," "Come, ye thankful people, come", and "Ten thousand times ten thousand." He translated the Odyssey, wrote a well-known manual of idiom, entitled A Plea for the Queen's English (1863), and was the first editor of the Contemporary Review (1866–1870).

His chief fame rests on his monumental edition of the New Testament in Greek (8 vols.), on which he worked from 1841 to 1861. In this work he first produced a careful collation of the readings of the chief manuscripts and the researches of the ripest continental scholarship of his day. Philological rather than theological in character, it marked an epochal change from the old homiletic commentary, and though more recent research, patristic and papyral, has largely changed the method of New Testament exegesis, Alford's work is still a quarry where the student can dig with a good deal of profit. See Alford's Law for an example.

Alford subsequently published the New Testament for English Readers (4 vols., Rivingtons, 1868). His Life, written by his widow, appeared in 1873 (Rivingtons).

References

Attribution

Bibliography

External links

 Article on one of Alford's Hymns
 Henry Alford at the Encyclopædia Britannica (1902)
 
 

1810 births
1871 deaths
19th-century English theologians
Linguists of English
English male poets
19th-century English Anglican priests
Anglican hymnwriters
Alumni of Trinity College, Cambridge
Fellows of Trinity College, Cambridge
English hymnwriters
Deans of Canterbury
Musicians from Kent
English male non-fiction writers
19th-century English musicians
19th-century British male writers
19th-century British writers
People from Wymeswold
Translators of Homer